"One in a Million" is the eighth track on American rock band Guns N' Roses' 1988 album G N' R Lies. It is based on singer Axl Rose's experience of getting hustled at a Greyhound bus station when he first came to Los Angeles.

Composition
"I came up with 'We tried to reach you but you were much too high,'" Rose told Mick Wall. "I was picturing [friends] trying to call me if, like, I disappeared or died… The chorus – 'You're one in a million' – someone said that to me once, real sarcastically. And it stuck with me… When I said 'Police and niggers/that's right,' that was to fuck with (band associate) Wes (Arkeen)'''s head. 'Cos he couldn't believe I would write that… The chorus came about because I was getting, like, really far away; like 'Rocket Man (song)', Elton John… Like in my head. Getting really far away from all my friends and family in Indiana."

 Controversy 
Accusations of homophobia, nativism and racism were levelled against singer and lyricist Axl Rose. Critic Jon Pareles noted that "with 'One in a Million' on G 'n' R Lies, the band tailored its image to appeal to white, heterosexual, nativist prejudices, denouncing blacks, immigrants and gays while coyly apologizing 'to those who may take offense' in the album notes."

In a 1989 Rolling Stone interview, Rose explained the lyrics:

The cover of GN'R Lies – a mock-tabloid newspaper design – contained an apology for the song, suggesting controversy was anticipated. A small "article" entitled "One in a Million", credited to Rose, ended: "This song is very simple and extremely generic or generalized, my apologies to those who may take offense."

In response to accusations of homophobia, Rose initially stated that he was "pro-heterosexual" and "I'm not against them doing what they want to do as long as it's not hurting anybody else and they're not forcing it upon me", and spoke of negative experiences in his past, such as a seemingly friendly man who let him crash on his hotel room floor, then tried to rape him. He later softened this stance, and insisted that he was not homophobic, pointing out that some of his icons, such as Freddie Mercury and Elton John, as well as David Geffen, the head of his record label, were bisexual or gay.

Others - including music industry peers - accused Rose of racism for the use of the word 'niggers'. When Guns N' Roses and Living Colour supported The Rolling Stones for a concert in Los Angeles in 1989, Living Colour guitarist Vernon Reid publicly commented on "One in a Million" during his band's set. Hearing this, Rose suggested they play the song in their act "just to piss them off".

Nirvana's Kurt Cobain also took offense, according to then-manager Danny Goldberg: "Kurt's whole thing about being a feminist, this was at a time when Guns N’ Roses had a song ['One in a Million'] that was on one of their big albums that referred to niggers and faggots. And we couldn't have had something more offensive to somebody like Kurt than that."

By 1992, however, Rose seemed to have gained new perspective on the song and its lyrics. "I was pissed off about some black people that were trying to rob me," he said. "I wanted to insult those particular black people." In his final public comments about "One in a Million" in 1992, Rose stated, "It was a way for me to express my anger at how vulnerable I felt in certain situations that had gone down in my life."

The song would continue to be decried, as publications such as WMMR, Loudwire and Jay Busbee listed it last or near last when ranking Guns N' Roses songs from best to worst.

"One in a Million" was not included on a 2018 box-set reissue of Appetite for Destruction, which featured the remaining G N' R Lies songs on a bonus disc. Slash explained it had been a collective decision, which didn't require a "big roundtable thing".

 Response from Guns N' Roses 
Before the release of Lies, the other members of the band tried in vain to make Rose drop the track from the record. Steven Adler exclaimed "What the fuck? Is this necessary?", to which Rose responded "Yeah, it's necessary. I'm letting my feelings out." Slash, whose mother is black, noted that he did not condone the song but did not condemn his bandmate, commenting in 1991 Rolling Stone'' interview: "When Axl first came up with the song and really wanted to do it, I said I didn't think it was very cool... I don't regret doing 'One in a Million', I just regret what we've been through because of it and the way people have perceived our personal feelings."

In 1988, rhythm guitarist Izzy Stradlin told rock critic Nick Kent that the lyrics simply reflected the poor race relations of inner city Los Angeles.

In a 2019 interview, Duff McKagan said: "One thing about Axl is if you’re going to try to compete with him intellectually, you’ve lost, because he’s a super smart guy... He’s a super sensitive dude who does his studies. When we did that song, I was still drinking but he was way ahead of us with his vision of, ‘Something’s gotta be said.’ That was the most hardcore way to say it. So flash-forward to now. So many people have misinterpreted that song that we removed it ... Nobody got it.”

Personnel 
 W. Axl Rose – lead vocals, piano
 Slash – lead acoustic guitar
 Izzy Stradlin – rhythm guitar
 Duff "Rose" McKagan – rhythm acoustic guitar
 Steven Adler – percussion

References 

Guns N' Roses songs
1988 songs
Songs written by Axl Rose
LGBT-related controversies in music
Obscenity controversies in music
Songs about Los Angeles
Anti-black racism in the United States
African-American-related controversies
LGBT-related songs
American folk rock songs
Works about racism
Self-censorship
Race-related controversies in music
Works about immigration to the United States